Hatem Qafisha (born 1963) is a current member of the Palestinian Legislative Council (PLC) representing Hebron. He is affiliated with the Hamas movement.

Biography
Qafisha was one of over 400 Hamas activists deported by Israel to Southern Lebanon in December 1992 for his membership in the organization. When he returned to the West Bank in 1993, he recorded his time in exile in a series of articles in the Al-Quds newspaper. He intended to publish a memoir, but Israeli prison guards confiscated his writings.

He campaigned for a seat in the PLC from his prison cell and was elected in January 2006. On November 6, 2007, the Israel Defense Forces (IDF) seized Qafisha from his home in Hebron as a part of series of arrests of Hamas members following the capturing of Israeli soldier Gilad Shalit by Palestinian militants. He was held in administrative detention in the Ketziot prison in the Negev Desert until his release on November 1, 2009. While in prison, Qafisha reportedly completed a PhD through correspondence courses. As a PLC member, he is working to promote sporting activities in the West Bank which includes plans to renovate the Hussein Stadium in Hebron. These plans have been put on hold since his imprisonment.

On 26 July 2020, IDF arrested Qafisha from his home in the city of Hebron.

References

1963 births
Living people
Hamas members
People from Hebron
Members of the 2006 Palestinian Legislative Council